The Provincial Assembly of  Bagmati Province also known as the  Bagmati Pradesh Sabha, (Nepali: वाग्मती प्रदेश सभा) is a unicameral governing and law making body of Bagmati Province, one of the seven provinces in Nepal The assembly is seated in the provincial capital at Hetauda in Makwanpur District at the Regional Educational Directorate Office. The assembly has 110 members of whom 66 are elected through first-past-the-post voting and 44 of whom are elected through proportional representation. The term of the assembly is five years unless dissolved earlier.

The present First Provincial Assembly was constituted in 2017 after the 2017 provincial elections. The election resulted in a majority for the alliance of CPN (Unified Marxist–Leninist) and CPN (Maoist Centre). The next election will take place when the five-year term ends by November 2022.

History 
The Provincial Assembly of Bagmati Province is formed under Article 175 of the Constitution of Nepal 2015 which guarantees a provincial legislative for each province in the country. The first provincial elections were conducted for all seven provinces in Nepal and the elections in Bagmati Province was conducted for 110 seats to the assembly. The election resulted in a victory for the CPN (Unified Marxist–Leninist) and CPN (Maoist Centre) alliance which later went on to form a coalition government under Dormani Poudel from CPN (UML). The first meeting of the assembly was called by Governor Anuradha Koirala for 1 February 2018. Sanu Kumar Shrestha from the CPN (UML) was elected as the first speaker of the provincial assembly, and Radhika Tamang from Maoist Centre was elected as the first deputy speaker. In May 2018, the two parties merged and formed the Nepal Communist Partywhich had a supermajority in the assembly.

List of Assemblies

Committees 
Article 195 of the Constitution of Nepal provides provincial assemblies the power to form special committees in order to manage working procedures.

Current composition

See also 
 Bagmati Province
 Provincial assemblies of Nepal

References 

Government of Bagmati Province
Province legislatures of Nepal
Unicameral legislatures